Joanna Louise Tindley (born 1 May 1987) is a British elite racing cyclist, who currently rides for the elite team Pro Noctis.

References

External links
 

1987 births
Living people
British female cyclists
Place of birth missing (living people)